Thomas Kanjirappally Oommen (born 29 November 1953) is an Indian Anglican bishop. He was the Bishop of the Madhya Kerala Diocese and Moderator of Church of South India.

Early years
Thomas K Oommen was born on 29 November 1953, to an agrarian Saint Thomas Anglican family at Thalavady in Alappuzha district. He did his college education at NSS Hindu College, Changanassery. He had taken an undergraduate degree in divinity from Leonard Theological College, Jabalpur, Madhya Pradesh.

Ecclesiastical career
Oommen was ordained deacon in 1982 and was made presbyter the next year. Oommen was elected as Bishop of Madhya Kerala Diocese of Church of South India in February 2011. He was ordained as the 12th Bishop of the CSI Madhya Kerala diocese at the Holy Trinity Cathedral, Kottayam on 5 March 2011. CSI Moderator Rt. Rev. S. Vasantha Kumar was the chief consecrator. Joseph Mar Thoma Metropolitan, CSI Deputy Moderator Rt. Rev. Gnanasigamony Devakadasham and CSI Bishop Rt. Rev. K. G. Daniel were Co-consecrators. Oommen was elected as the Deputy Moderator of Church of South India at the Church of South India Synod held at Vijayawada on 11 January 2014 and as the Moderator and Primate of Church of South India at the Synod held at Kottayam on 15 January 2017.

References

1953 births
Living people
Anglican bishops of Madhya Kerala
People from Alappuzha district
Senate of Serampore College (University) alumni
21st-century Anglican bishops in India
Leonard Theological College alumni
Moderators of the Church of South India
Anglican bishops of Thoothukudi - Nazareth